Nguyễn Văn Lém (1931/1932 – 1 February 1968), often referred to as Bảy Lốp, was an officer of the Viet Cong with the rank of captain. He was summarily executed in Saigon by Republic of Vietnam general Nguyễn Ngọc Loan during the Tet Offensive in the Vietnam War. A photo of the execution won the 1969 Pulitzer Prize for Spot News Photography and helped galvanize the anti-war movement in the United States.

Execution 
Nguyễn Văn Lém was a captain in the Viet Cong and was known by the code name Bảy Lốp. His wife, Nguyễn Thị Lốp, explained that his code name consisted of "Bảy" for a seventh son, and "Lốp" from her own name.

Lém was captured in civilian clothing near Saigon's Ấn Quang Pagoda on 1 February 1968, amid the Tet Offensive, a massive surprise attack by the Viet Cong and North Vietnamese forces. He was brought to Brigadier General Nguyễn Ngọc Loan, Chief of the Republic of Vietnam National Police, at 252 Ngô Gia Tự Street, District 10, near the present-day Chùa Trấn Quốc temple. The 36-year-old Lém was accused of murdering South Vietnamese Lieutenant Colonel Nguyễn Tuân, his wife, six children, and the officer's 80-year-old mother. He was allegedly captured near a mass grave of approximately thirty civilians. 

Loan summarily executed Lém in the street, using his .38 Special Smith & Wesson Bodyguard revolver to shoot the bound prisoner through the head.  The event was witnessed and recorded by Võ Sửu, a cameraman for NBC, and Eddie Adams, an Associated Press photographer. The photograph and film became famous images in contemporary American journalism, and won Adams the 1969 Pulitzer Prize for Spot News Photography.

Loan was reported to have said afterwards: "If you hesitate, if you didn't do your duty, the men won't follow you."

In 2018, author Max Hastings detailed the allegations against Lém, adding that American historian Edwin Moise "is convinced that the entire story of Lém murdering the Tuân family is a post-war invention" and that "The truth will never be known."

Photograph 

Associated Press photographer Eddie Adams and NBC News television cameraman Võ Sửu witnessed the event. Adams later recalled that he believed Loan was going to "threaten or terrorise" Lém, and took out his camera to record the event. The photograph he subsequently captured showed the moment the bullet entered Lém's head.

The photograph and film were broadcast worldwide, galvanizing the anti-war movement in the United States. Adams' photo of the event became one of the most famous and influential images of the war, winning him the 1969 Pulitzer Prize for Spot News Photography.

The photo also came to haunt Adams: "I was getting money for showing one man killing another. Two lives were destroyed, and I was getting paid for it. I was a hero." He elaborated on this in a later piece of writing: "Two people died in that photograph. The general killed the Viet Cong; I killed the general with my camera." Adams later stated he regretted he was unable to get a picture "of that Viet Cong [Lém] blowing away the [Tuân] family".

Ben Wright, associate director for communications at the Dolph Briscoe Center for American History, said of the photo: "There's something in the nature of a still image that deeply affects the viewer and stays with them. The film footage of the shooting, while ghastly, doesn't evoke the same feelings of urgency and stark tragedy."

Aftermath 
Lém's wife, Lốp, learned about her husband's death when she was given a newspaper with the photo on the front page. It is unknown what happened to his body.

In 1975, Loan fled South Vietnam during the Fall of Saigon, eventually emigrating to the United States. Pressure from the U.S. Congress resulted in an investigation by the Library of Congress, which concluded that Lém's summary execution was illegal under South Vietnamese law. In 1978, the Immigration and Naturalization Service (INS) contended that Loan had committed a war crime. They attempted to deport him, but President Jimmy Carter personally intervened to stop the proceedings, stating that "such historical revisionism was folly". Loan died on July 14, 1998, in Burke, Virginia, at the age of 67.

The sole survivor of Lém's alleged killing of Tuân's family was Huan Nguyen; aged nine at the time, he was shot twice during the attack that killed his family and stayed with his mother for two hours as she bled to death. In 2019, he became the highest-ranking Vietnamese-American officer in the U.S. military when he was promoted to the rank of rear admiral in the United States Navy.

In 2012, Douglas Sloan made a short film, Saigon '68, about Adams' photograph. This film details the influence it had on the lives of Adams and Loan, and on public opinion of the Vietnam War.

See also 
Phan Thị Kim Phúc 
Thích Quảng Đức
List of photographs considered the most important

References

External links 

The Saigon Execution, a thorough account by an AP photo editor including research after the war.
Feb. 1, 1968: A grisly moment from the Vietnam War -St. Louis Dispatch

Year of birth uncertain
1968 deaths
Black-and-white photographs
Deaths by person in Asia
Extrajudicial killings
February 1968 events in Asia
Filmed executions
1968 in art
1968 in Vietnam
1968 photographs
Police brutality in Asia
Vietnam War crimes by South Vietnam
Vietnam War photographs